TV Show King is a quiz video game developed by Gameloft Montreal and published by Gameloft. It was released as one of the WiiWare launch titles in North and Latin America on May 12, 2008. It was also released later for iPhone OS in November 2008. The game was also released for PlayStation 3 on August 6, 2009 as a download from the PlayStation Store, and includes trophy support.

Gameplay

Up to four players, represented by Miis in the Wii version, compete against each other in a three, six or nine round trivia contest. The 3000 trivia questions cover a wide range of subjects, ranging from geography and general knowledge to pop culture, with a number of region specific questions.

Players are given timed multiple choice answers, with players selecting their answers on their screen with the Wii Remote, with the fastest lock-ins with the correct answer resulting in bigger prize money. Players can also take their chances for greater rewards by spinning a wheel with both good and bad outcomes after each round. At the end of the last round, the two highest scoring players are pitted against each other in the Final Duel to determine the winner.

In the Final Duel, the two finalists are asked questions, each one worth one point. Points are awarded for correct answers. If both contestants answer the same question correctly, the point is awarded to whichever player locked in with the correct answer the fastest. The first contestant to win five points is declared the winner, and half of the runner-up's money is added to the amount the winner had before the Final Duel.

In addition to the main game, a shorter quiz called "Quiz Attack" is also available for solo players.

Reception

TV Show King received generally average reviews from critics.

IGN, which scored the game with a 6.4/10, praised the graphics and presentation, but had some concerns with elements of the gameplay. They also claimed that the game was "a far better multiplayer game than it is a solo experience". GamePlasma found that the game had little replayability and subsequently gave it an overall score of 6.2/10, stating that "TV Show King is an adequate first effort from Gameloft for the WiiWare service. It’s not the best console-based game of its type out there, nor is it the best trivia game on the Wii platform."

WiiWare World gave TV Show King a 6/10, believing that most of what the player will enjoy about the game is from what other players will bring from outside the game. N-Europe also gave the game a 6/10, describing it as "a fun title that can be played in short bursts every so often", praising its multiplayer and Mii usage. They also thought that the game was priced too steep at 1000 Wii Points, due to its lacklustre single-player mode. Edge awarded the game 5 out of 10, stating that the repetitive levels and basic look and feel had a large effect on the game's lifespan.

Sequels 

An expanded follow up to the game, called TV Show King Party, was released in North America on October 28, 2008 also for the Wii. However, unlike the first game, it was a retail release.

A WiiWare sequel, TV Show King 2, was released for the Wiiware in North America and Europe on December 21, 2009 and December 25, 2009 respectively. This sequel also has trophy support based on the player's accomplishments. This game had 8000 questions (into 12 different categories), and received a much better rating than its predecessor. IGN gave the sequel a 7.8, higher than the 6.4 it gave the predecessor. Wiiloveit.com gave the game a 28/30, describing it as "one of Gameloft's best releases yet" especially because of its strong online presence. Also, the game was priced  at 800 Wii Points, instead of the predecessor's 1000. Some other additions to the game are the Nintendo Wi-Fi Connection/Online Play, a Question Creator, a Question Downloaded that lets you download fan-made questions and more.

References 

2008 video games
IOS games
PlayStation Network games
Quiz video games
Ubisoft games
Video games developed in Canada
Vivendi franchises
Wii games
WiiWare games
Gameloft games